Marina Sumić (born 18 August 1991) is a Croatian taekwondo practitioner.

She won a silver medal in lightweight at the 2011 World Taekwondo Championships, after being defeated by Rangsiya Nisaisom in the final. Her achievements at the European Taekwondo Championships include silver medals in 2012 and 2014.

References

External links

1991 births
Living people
Croatian female taekwondo practitioners
European Games competitors for Croatia
Taekwondo practitioners at the 2015 European Games
World Taekwondo Championships medalists
European Taekwondo Championships medalists
21st-century Croatian women